Xu Liang (born 12 August 1981 in Shenyang) is a Chinese footballer.

Club career
Xu Liang started his football career with the youth systems of Liaoning F.C. in 2001 and eventually graduated to their first team in the 2002 league season where he made 23 appearances in his debut season. After establishing himself into the first team, he would be an integral member that saw Liaoning reach the final of the Chinese FA Cup in 2002. Off the field on December 6, 2004, he aided in the rescue of an injured woman who was involved in a car crash in Shenyang before taking her to hospital. After five seasons with Liaoning the club admitted they were in deep financial crisis and Xu was allowed to leave the club with Beijing Guoan interested in his services, however the two club's could not agree upon the 5.5 million Yuan transfer fee.

Xu would have trails with Dutch club Heracles Almelo and Russian club FC Torpedo Moscow, however any transfer fell through with neither team could willing to agree upon a reported one million Euros transfer fee. On December 31, 2006, he would transfer to second-tier team Guangzhou Pharmaceutical for 3 million Yuan. In his debut season he would quickly establish himself as vital member within the team's midfield and helped see the team win the league and gain promotion to the Chinese Super League in 2007. He would help establish Guangzhou within the top tier and was made vice-captain within the team, however his outspoken personality saw him publicly criticise his teammate, Zhou Lin for having a bad game against Beijing Guoan on June 28, 2009, in a 1–1 draw, which saw infighting between the two breakout and Zhou being frozen out of the team. Xu's outspoken personality was not limited to his own teammates and October 24, 2009, against Qingdao Jonoon in a 0–0 draw he would verbally tirade the referee for his decision making, which resulted in Xu receiving a five-game suspension.

On 12 February 2010, he was signed by Beijing Guoan after Guangzhou was relegated due to a match-fixing scandal. On 4 August 2012, Xu scored from a distance of 62 meters in a league match against Dalian Shide, which is the longest goal scored in Chinese top tier history.

Xu transferred to fellow Chinese Super League side Shanghai Shenhua on 11 December 2012. After an injury plagued period with Shanghai, Xu decided to retire from football at the end of the 2014 season.

On 3 February 2016, Xu came out of retirement and joined China League One club  Shenzhen F.C.

International career
Xu Liang would play for the Chinese under-20 football team and would make the squad for the 2001 FIFA World Youth Championship where China were knocked out in the last 16 by Argentina. After the tournament he was promoted to the Chinese under-23 football team but was dropped from the squad on January 26, 2002, along with Lu Jiang and Zhang Shuai for breaking team curfew rules to go out clubbing. Xu was eventually brought back into the team where he participated in the 2002 Asian Games, which saw China reach the quarterfinals.

Career statistics

Club statistics
Statistics accurate as of match played 3 November 2018.

International goals
Results list China's goal tally first.

Honours

Club
Guangzhou Pharmaceutical
 China League One: 2007

Individual
Chinese Football Association Young Player of the Year: 2002
Chinese Super League Team of the Year: 2004, 2009

References

External links

Database at Sohu.com
Blog 

1981 births
Living people
Footballers from Shenyang
Chinese footballers
China international footballers
Liaoning F.C. players
Guangzhou F.C. players
Beijing Guoan F.C. players
Shanghai Shenhua F.C. players
Shenzhen F.C. players
Chinese Super League players
China League One players
Footballers at the 2002 Asian Games
Association football midfielders
Asian Games competitors for China